Chabot Park is located in the Southeastern section of the Oakland Hills. The neighborhood has a population of around 2,845. Chabot Park is in Alameda County. The neighborhood is adjacent to Knowland State Park and the Oakland Zoo.

References

Neighborhoods in Oakland, California